St. Francis is an unincorporated community in central Alberta within Leduc County, located  north of Highway 39,  west of Leduc.

Localities in Leduc County